Aubane Droguet (born 27 December 2002) is a French tennis player.

She has career-high WTA rankings of 711 in singles, achieved on 23 August 2021, and 454 in doubles, reached on 18 April 2022. 

Droguet made her Grand Slam main-draw debut at the 2019 French Open, after receiving a wildcard for the doubles tournament, partnering Séléna Janicijevic.

In July 2019, she won her first title on the professional circuit, in the doubles event at Les Contamines-Montjoie, France, partnering Margaux Rouvroy.

ITF Circuit finals

Singles: 3 (3 runner–ups)

Doubles: 3 (2 titles, 1 runner–up)

References

External links
 
 

2002 births
Living people
French female tennis players